The DC Shorts Film Festival is an annual film festival held in Washington, D.C.

Started in 2003 by Jon Gann and Gene Cowan, the festival was designed to showcase the best short films from around the globe, strengthen Washington, DC's filmmaking community, and honor all visual storytellers. The first event was three days and showcased 33 films. It has since grown to over 10 days and more than 120 films every festival.

History
DC Shorts provides opportunities for filmmakers of every skill level to explore and learn the craft of filmmaking while entertaining and expanding the horizons of audience members. This is done through a series of regularly scheduled educational programs, screening opportunities, sharing resources via online tools, partnering with film, arts and business organizations, as well as the annual DC Shorts International Film Festival and Screenplay Competition.
Founded in 2003, the DC Shorts International Film Festival was created by DC-based filmmaker, Jon Gann, in response to the dozens of festivals where the focus wasn’t on the filmmakers and their craft. Jon decided to start his own event, focusing on the form he loves - short films.
In 2006, the DC Film Alliance, a nonprofit arts organization, was created to present the DC Shorts Film Festival, and offer other programs and resources for Washington, D.C.-based filmmakers. The Alliance helped to bridge the gap between other area film organizations, foster a community for regional film festival directors, and sponsored monthly salons to educate filmmakers of all levels.
In response to the needs of the industry, DC Shorts has recently rebranded many DC Film Alliance activities, re-tooled others, and now hosts year-round programming.

Programming
DC Shorts Wins: special showcases of award-winning films from previous DC Shorts. Each year, some of the films have received Academy Award nominations. All of the films have won accolades worldwide.

DC Shorts Laughs: favorite comedy films from previous DC Shorts, paired with live stand-up performances by the DC area’s top stand-up comics! Each 90-minute show combines film and live performance for a spectacular and lighthearted evening.

Mentors: Through DC Shorts Mentors, independent filmmakers are encouraged to develop their skills to create outstanding media projects. Workshops led by film professionals and peers, these interactive sessions are designed to build upon one another, developing the skills needed to better compete in the crowded field of filmmakers.

DC Shorts International Film Festival: This festival showcases one of the largest collections of short films in the USA. The 10-day festival has included educational workshops, family showcases at multiple DC public libraries, specialty Showcases (LGBTQ, Documentary, Animation, Comedy, Horror), a screenplay competition that includes live table readings and a cash prize, and numerous receptions for filmmakers and film-lovers alike.

Online Film Library: DC Shorts is happy to present over 375 films from past years for short film-lovers viewing pleasure. All of the films may be watched full-screen, and many are in HD.

2019 Event Schedule
DC Shorts Film Festival 2019 Screenings: Friday, September 20 - Saturday, September 28, 2019.

City View Party: Saturday, September 23 - This kick-off party is open to the public who can meet and mingle with the filmmakers to celebrate the beginning of the 16th annual festival. It will take place at the Cambria Hotel Rooftop.

Screenplay Auditions: Friday, September 27 - Auditions to participate in a screenplay table reading of screenplay finalists at the Landmark E Street Theater.

Screenplay Competition: Friday, September 27 - The Screenplay Competition showcasing six finalists to determine the winning screenplay at the Miracle Theater.

References

External links

Film festivals in Washington, D.C.
Short film festivals in the United States
Film festivals established in 2003